Ryugadous is a genus of beetles in the family Carabidae, containing the following species:

 Ryugadous atorus Ueno, 1965
 Ryugadous awanus Ueno, 1969
 Ryugadous ciliatus Ueno, 1955
 Ryugadous elongatulus Ueno, 1979
 Ryugadous ishikawai Habu, 1950
 Ryugadous kajimotoi Ueno, 1975
 Ryugadous kasaharai Ueno & Y.Ito, 2002
 Ryugadous kiuchii Ueno, 1969
 Ryugadous mimus Ueno, 1965
 Ryugadous pravus Ueno, 1979
 Ryugadous solidior Ueno, 1975
 Ryugadous uozumii Ueno, 1955

References

Trechinae